Wilson Airport is an airport in Nairobi, Kenya, Africa (IATA: WIL).

Wilson Airport may also refer to:

 Wilson Airport (Arkansas) in Stephens, Arkansas, United States (FAA: 4F8)

Similar names:
 Rocky Mount–Wilson Regional Airport in Rocky Mount/Wilson, North Carolina, United States (FAA/IATA: RWI)
 Wilson Industrial Air Center in Wilson, North Carolina, United States (FAA: W03)
 Wilson's Airport in Hickory, North Carolina, United States (FAA: E40)
 Wilson Ranch Airport, in Crooke County, Oregon, United States (FAA: OG12)